Maritiman is a floating maritime museum on the Göta Älv, in Gothenburg, Sweden. The museum's collection comprises 19 vessels, the oldest being HSwMS Sölve from 1875.

The collection
All of the vessels are afloat on the river. The collection includes:
Cargo ship Fryken
HSwMS Småland, Halland class destroyer
ESAB IV
Flodsprutan II
Gothenburg barge
Lightship Fladen
HSwMS Kalmarsund, Minelaying vessel
Monitor Sölve
Port ferry Dan Broström
Port towboat Stormprincess 
HSwMS Nordkaparen, Draken-class
Towboat Herkules
HSwMS Hugin, Hugin-class patrol boat

See also
 , another a maritime museum in Göteborg

External links
Official website

1985 establishments in Sweden
Maritime museums in Sweden
Museums established in 1985
Museums in Gothenburg